Gamma-aminobutyric acid receptor subunit delta is a protein that in humans is encoded by the GABRD gene. In the mammalian brain, the delta (δ) subunit forms specific GABAA receptor subtypes by co-assembly leading to δ subunit containing GABAA receptors (δ-GABAA receptors).

Structure and function 
The delta (δ) subunit, one of the subunits of the hetero-pentameric δ-GABAA receptors, is a determinant subunit for the specific cellular localization of δ-GABAA receptors, which are modulated by the GABA. GABA is the major inhibitory neurotransmitter in the mammalian brain where it acts on the repertoire of GABAA receptors, the ligand-gated chloride channels. It is assembled from a diverse subunit pool, including assemblies from a family of 19 subunits (α1-α6, β1-β3, γ1-γ3, δ, ∈, θ, π and ρ1-ρ3). The GABRD gene encodes the delta (δ) subunit. Specifically, the δ-subunit is usually expressed in GABAA receptors associated with extrasynaptic activity, mediating tonic inhibition, which is slower compared to classical inhibition (phasic or synaptic inhibition). The most common  GABAA receptors have the gamma subunit, which allows the receptor to bind benzodiazepines. For this reason, receptors containing δ-subunits (δ-GABAA receptor) are sometimes referred to as “benzodiazepine-insensitive”  GABAA receptors.  However, they do show an exquisitely high sensitivity to ethanol compared to the benzodiazepine-sensitive receptors, which do not respond to ethanol however these results are not fully confirmed in the literature. The δ-subunit containing receptors are also known to be involved in the ventral tegmental area (VTA) pathway in the brain's hippocampus, which means that they may have implications in learning, memory, and reward.

Cloning of GABAA receptor 
GABAA receptors were initially cloned by the classical method that the peptide sequences obtained from purified (bovine brain) receptors were used to construct synthetic DNA probes to screen brain cDNA libraries. Eventually, this technique have led to the identification of most of the gene family with its isoforms: α1-α6, β1-β3, γ1-γ3 subunits and one δ subunit.

Cell type-specific expression 
The cellular localization of mRNAs of 13 GABAA receptor subunits was analyzed in different brain regions. For example, in the cerebellum, various receptor subtypes are found in cerebellar granule cells and Purkinje cells, whereas in the olfactory bulb, periglomerular cells, tufted cells, and internal granule cells express GABAA receptor subtypes. Specifically, the pattern of cell type-specific δ subunit expression is shown in the table below.

In a technical comparison between quantitative reverse transcriptase PCR and digital PCR, the expression of the rat gabrd gene was examined across three cell types in the somatosensory cortex: neurogliaform cells, fast spiking basket cells and pyramidal cells.  Gene expression was detected in all three cell types, but showed marked enrichment in neurogliaform cells versus the other cell types examined.  The GABAA receptor delta subunit is profoundly downregulated with chronic intermittent exposure to ethanol, and appears to contribute strongly to pathological alcohol dependence.

δ-subunit GFP tagging 
Subunits of GABA A receptors were tagged by Green Fluorescent Protein (GFP) or its variants (EGFP) to study trafficking, localization, oligomerization, and protein interactions of relevant receptor subtypes and the relevant subunits. Typically, the EGFP or GFP tagging has been done in the N-terminus or C-terminus of the mature peptide sequence of relevant subunit. The GFP tagging of δ-subunit was performed in the different domains of the subunit such as the N-terminus, C-terminus as well as intracellular (cytoplasmic) domain. Nevertheless, despite these and other studies, it is not clear if this subunit requires α and β subunits for the membrane targeting since literature suggests conflicting results. By the use of GFP tagging of this subunit, one group reported that the cell membrane expression of the δ subunit was observed only in the presence of both α and β subunits. However, another group suggested that the δ subunit can target to the cell membrane and the βδ containing receptors exist.

See also 
 GABAA receptor

References

Further reading

External links 
 

Ion channels